Hollins Brook is a watercourse in Greater Manchester and a tributary of the River Roch. It originates in Unsworth and is one of the habitats that makes up Hollins Vale Nature Reserve.

Tributaries

Brightley Brook
Whittle Brook
Castle Brook
Langley Brook

References

Rivers of the Metropolitan Borough of Bury
Rivers of Greater Manchester
1